Il Pompeo is a dramma per musica in three acts by composer Alessandro Scarlatti. Written in 1682 when Scarlatti was 22 years old, it was his fourth opera and first dramatic work on a serious and grand subject. The opera uses an Italian language libretto by Nicolò Minato which had previously been used by Francesco Cavalli for his 1666 opera Pompeo Magno. The work premiered at the Teatro di Palazzo Colonna in Rome on 25 January 1683.

Roles

References

1683 operas
Italian-language operas
Operas
Operas by Alessandro Scarlatti